Leucanopsis lineata is a moth of the family Erebidae. It was described by William Schaus in 1894. It is found in Brazil and Paraguay.

References

lineata
Moths described in 1894